Hanna Sahlfeld-Singer (born 17 October 1943) is a Swiss former politician. She was one of the first group of women elected to the National Council in 1971, serving until 1975.

Biography
Sahlfeld-Singer was born in Flawil in October 1943, the daughter of Margrith (née Hohl) and Werner Singer (a master weaver). After attending primary and secondary school in Flawil, she completed her education at the cantonal school in St. Gallen. She subsequently studied Protestant theology. In 1968 she married Rolf Sahfeld, a pastor, and began carrying out part time pastoral work in Altstätten. The following year she was ordained.

After women were granted the right to vote in federal elections, Sahfeld-Singer was nominated as a candidate of the Social Democratic Party (SP) in St Gallen for the 1971 federal elections. She was elected to the National Council, becoming the youngest of the group of twelve women elected. In order to take her seat, she had to give up her pastoral work due to a constitutional ban on clergy being MPs. The following year she gave birth, becoming the first sitting Swiss MP to do so.

Although she was re-elected in 1975, she gave up her seat as she and her husband moved to Wil. Later in 1975 the couple moved to West Germany, where Sahlfeld-Singer worked as a school pastor at a school in Wipperfürth from 1976 to 2003. After retiring, she moved to Barsinghausen.

References

1943 births
Living people
People from the canton of St. Gallen
Members of the National Council (Switzerland)
Social Democratic Party of Switzerland politicians
20th-century Swiss women politicians
20th-century Swiss politicians
Swiss emigrants to Germany